The Business of Being Born is a 2008 documentary film that explores the contemporary experience of childbirth in the United States. Directed by Abby Epstein and produced by Ricki Lake, it compares various childbirth methods, including midwives, natural births, epidurals, and Cesarean sections.

Content
The film criticizes the American health care system with its emphasis on medicines and costly interventions and its view of childbirth as a medical emergency rather than a natural occurrence. Lake drew inspiration for the documentary from the disappointing experience she had had with the birth of her first son, Milo Sebastian Sussman.

The film documents actual home births and water births, including in the latter category that of Lake's own second son, Owen Tyler Sussman. They follow a midwife, Cara, in New York City as she takes care of and attends several births. They then give the audience several statistics about our current birthing techniques and challenge today's doctors. Many experts are interviewed and they cite a multitude of reasons for these, such as the overuse of medical procedures in the interest of saving time.

Cast
Ricki Lake
Abby Epstein
Julia Barnett Tracy
Louann Brizendine
Michael L. Brodman
Natashia Fuksman

DVD release
The DVD was released in the US on May 6, 2008 and soon after an international version was released.

See also
 Orgasmic Birth: The Best-Kept Secret
 More Business of Being Born
 Medicating Normal
 Homebirth
 Waterbirth
 Midwife
 Doulas

References

External links
 
 
 
 Interview by Lamaze President Allison Walsh
 Interview by Motherwords
 Interview by Celesta Rannisi, Host of "Timely Topics in Childbirth"

2008 films
American documentary films
Documentary films about pregnancy
2008 documentary films
2000s pregnancy films
American pregnancy films
2000s English-language films
2000s American films